MHNP may refer to:

 Muséum national d'histoire naturelle, French national natural history museum, Paris (although the official initialism for that museum is MNHN);
 Psychiatric and mental health Nurse Practitioner.